Colombina Violeta Parra Tuca (born 1970) is a Chilean musician and singer. She was part of the Chilean grunge/alternative rock scene in the 1990s. Her band, Ex, were well known in Latin America when their first album came out with singles like "Sacar la Basura", "La Corbata de mi Tío" and "Vendo Diario" in 1996.

Parra is the daughter of the physicist, mathematician and self-titled "anti-poet" Nicanor Parra and the niece of famed folk singer Violeta Parra.

See also
Parra family

References 

                   

Living people
20th-century Chilean women singers
Chilean rock singers
Women heavy metal singers
1970 births
Colombina Parra
21st-century Chilean women singers